The total number of newspapers are 707 as 2019 according to Pakistan bureau of statistic.Following is a list of newspapers in Pakistan.

References

External links
 

Pakistan
List
Lists of mass media in Pakistan